Kabulasoke is a town in Gomba District in the Central Region of Uganda.

Location
The town is in Kabulasoke Sub-county, being one of the nine parishes in that administrative unit.

The coordinates of Kabulasoke are 0°09'25.0"N, 31°48'42.0"E (Latitude:0.156944; Longitude:31.811667).

Overview
In April 2015, MSS Xsabo Power Limited applied for a license to generate 20 megawatts of solar power from the then proposed Kabulasoke Solar Power Station, located in Namulasa Village, Butiti Parish, Kabulasoke Sub-County, Gomba District. The project was completed in December 2018, launching the start of a 20-year Power Purchase Agreement with the Government of the Republic of Uganda.  The plant will serve power to 5 million people in rural Uganda. 

The  Mpigi–Kabulasoke–Maddu–Sembabule Road passes through town. The town is also the location of Kabulasoke CORE Primary Teachers' College.

References

External links
 Gomba Pupils Have No Roof - 31 March 2013

Populated places in Central Region, Uganda
Cities in the Great Rift Valley
Gomba District